Amos W. Hoag (17 May 1805 – 5 June 1895) was an American politician.

Amos Hoag was born in Starksboro, Vermont, to parents Elihu Hoag and Dorcas Powell on 17 May 1805. He moved to Ward Township, Winneshiek County, Iowa, where he became a farmer. Hoag was married to Persis Hallock from June 1830 to her death in September of the same year. In October 1831, he married a second time, to Emeline Wild Power, with whom he raised nine children. Hoag was elected coroner of Winneshiek County in 1857. Between 1860 and 1862, he was a member of the Iowa House of Representatives. Hoag held the District 57 seat as a Republican. He died on 5 June 1895.

References

People from Winneshiek County, Iowa
1805 births
1895 deaths
People from Starksboro, Vermont
American coroners
19th-century American politicians
Republican Party members of the Iowa House of Representatives
Farmers from Iowa
County officials in Iowa